The 1992 Victorian Football Association season was the 111th season of the Australian rules football competition. The premiership was won by the Sandringham Football Club, after it defeated Williamstown in the grand final on 20 September by 44 points; it was Sandringham's fourth top-division premiership.

Premiership season
In the home-and-away season, each team played eighteen games; the top five then contested the finals under the McIntyre final five system. Finals were played at North Port Oval, and the grand final was played at Princes Park.

Ladder

Finals

Awards
The joint-leading goalkickers for the home-and-away season were Frank Rugolo (Sandringham) and Jamie Shaw, who each kicked 73 goals. For the whole season including finals, the leading goalkicker was Ian Rickman (Williamstown), who kicked 82 goals.
The J. J. Liston Trophy was won by Joe Rugolo (Sandringham), who polled 19 votes. Rugolo finished ahead of Simon Clark (Springvale), Tom Snelton (Prahran) and Paul Williams (Frankston), who finished equal-second with sixteen votes apiece.
The Fothergill-Round Medal was won by Julian Shanks (Williamstown).
Frankston won the seconds premiership. Frankston 19.10 (124) defeated Preston 12.13 (85) in the grand final, held as a curtain-raiser to the Seniors Grand Final on 20 September.

Notable events

Interleague matches
The Association played one interleague match, against the Victorian Country Football League, during the 1992 season. The match was played as a curtain-raiser to the state-of-origin match between Victoria and Western Australia at the Melbourne Cricket Ground. Leon Harris (Werribee) was coach of the Association team and Tony Pastore (Williamstown) was captain; the VCFL was coached by Gerard FitzGerald, who two decades later became the all-time record holder for VFA/VFL premiership games coached.

Premiers Cup
During March, Dandenong and Werribee contested the Premiers Cup, a new (but ultimately once-off) sixteen-team knock-out competition featuring 1991 grand finalists from the VFA and the Victorian Amateur Football Association, and the premiers from twelve other suburban and major country football leagues in Victoria. The two Association teams faced each other in their semi-final, with Werribee victorious.

The results of games featuring Association teams are given below.

Other notable events
After 33 years of fielding sixteen players per side, the Association returned to fielding the national standard eighteen players per side in senior and reserves games from 1992.
The Association abandoned the practice of playing the ABC's televised match-of-the-round at the central North Port Oval, which had been the case since 1988, in favour of playing at the home team's normal home venue, due to the low crowds drawn to North Port Oval matches not featuring Port Melbourne.
On 26 April, Preston 22.5 (137) defeated Williamstown 20.14 (134) after Preston's Anthony Cardamone – who had been brought into the team as an emergency and had spent the first half of the game on the bench – kicked a goal from 25m after the final siren.
On 30 May, Sandringham 26.17 (173) defeated a remarkably accurate Preston 17.1 (103). Mark Sedgwick scored Preston's sole behind with a dribbled kick at the goals with ten seconds remaining in the final quarter.
 In the qualifying final between Williamstown and Prahran, Williamstown recovered from a 31-point deficit in the final quarter to tie the scores at 16.10 (106) at the end of regulation time, resulting in ten minutes of extra time (in two five-minute halves) being played to decide the game. It was the first time extra time had been used in a VFA finals match, and many present, including Prahran coach Brian Taylor, were unaware that the provision to play extra time had recently been introduced to avoid the need to replay entire finals matches.
Overuse and inclement weather during the finals turned North Port Oval into a mudheap. The Association moved as many minor grade finals away from the ground as it could (playing many at Chirnside Park) and unsuccessfully attempted to shift the senior preliminary final to an AFL ground.

See also
List of VFA/VFL Premiers
 Australian rules football
 Victorian Football League

References

Victorian Football League seasons
VFL